The 1930 European Amateur Boxing Championships were held in Budapest, Hungary from 4 to 8 June. It was the third edition of the competition, organised by the European governing body for amateur boxing, EABA. There were 64 fighters from 11 countries participating.

Medal winners

Medal table

References

External links
European Championships
Results
EABA Boxing

European Amateur Boxing Championships
Boxing
European Amateur Boxing Championships
International boxing competitions hosted by Hungary
European Amateur Boxing Championships
European Amateur Boxing Championships
International sports competitions in Budapest